Puttini is a surname. Notable people with the surname include:

Daniele Sarzi Puttini (born 1996), Italian footballer 
Felice Puttini (born 1967), Swiss cyclist